Castlethorpe railway station was a railway station serving the Buckinghamshire village of the same name in what is now the City of Milton Keynes, on the West Coast Main Line in England. The station was located south of the bridge over the current line on what remains Station Road.

History 
Castlethorpe station was opened for goods in 1881 and the first passenger train arrived at 8.30am on Monday, 2 August 1882.

Closure
Despite a strong campaign to keep the station open, mounted by the parish council, Sir Frank Markham, Member of Parliament for Buckingham and Robert Maxwell the prospective Labour Party candidate, the station was closed to passengers on 6 September 1964.

Routes

Present day 
The West Coast Main Line runs through the site of the station where sections of the platforms were still in situ in 2021. The buildings were demolished soon after closure.

See also 
 Roade cutting

References

Disused railway stations in Buckinghamshire
Former London and North Western Railway stations
Railway stations in Great Britain opened in 1882
Railway stations in Great Britain closed in 1964
Beeching closures in England
Railway stations in Milton Keynes